Technology Centre Teknia Ltd. (Teknia), also known as Kuopio Science Park, is a university related research park located in Kuopio, Finland. 

Teknia has been the fastest growing Technology Park in Finland for the new millennium.

Teknia was acquired in spring 2008 by Technopolis plc for total cost of 18,1 million euros (67 million euros debts included).

Major organisations located at Kuopio Science Park
 University of Eastern Finland, Kuopio campus (formerly University of Kuopio) 
 Savonia University of Applied Sciences (Savonia), Administration & Admissions offices, IT & Electronics Engineering education unit. 
 Kuopio University Hospital 
 Technology Centre Teknia

Offices of national organisations
 Neulanen Research Centre (public, occupational and environmental health): National Public Health Institute (KTL) , The Finnish Institute of Occupational Health (FIOH)  and Finnish Food Safety Authority (EVIRA) 
 Own building: The Geological Survey of Finland (GTK) 
 In Teknia-buildings: VTT Technical Research Centre of Finland

Technology Centre Teknia
 Manages the infrastructure of *teknia -dubbed office buildings
 Offers startup- (business hatchery) and internationalization services for companies (also houses a wide variety of other producers of these services)
 Has a side office in Shanghai, China, which manages health care projects between Finland and China.
 Houses joint-use laboratories, e.g. Sensor Development Lab, where UEF, Savonia & Honeywell jointly develop new microsensors.
 Houses a total of 300 small businesses and local offices of multinational corporations and a few with a whole office building such as Honeywell and Ark Therapeutics.
 World's first gene based pharmaceutical plant, by Ark Therapeutics was opened for business in 2007.
 Mediteknia Research Centre, WellTeknia , Centek 
 A. I. Virtanen Institute and Bioteknia Research Centre (gene therapy, neurosciences, molecular medicine, pharmacology)
 Microteknia Research Centre and Teknia Technology Centre (IT)

The businesses based in Teknia specialize in information and communication technology and wellbeing technology (agrobiotechnology, drug design, and health care technology).

Teknia's International Cooperation Partner Parks: Zhongguancun Software Park (zPark, located in "the Chinese Silicon Valley"), Wuxi Life Science & Technology Park, Shanghai Zhangjiang Hi-Tech Park, Hong Kong Science and Technology Parks, IZET Innovationszentrum ltzehoe, TEKNIKBYN Västerås Technology Park, University of Surrey, University Enterprise Laboratories, Inc. (University of Minnesota)

Construction stages
Tietoteknia   1990
Bioteknia 1   1994
Bioteknia 2   1999
Microteknia 1 2000
Microteknia 2 2002
MicroTower    2004
Microteknia 3 2005
Microteknia 4 2006
Innoteknia    2007

See also
 List of tallest buildings in Finland

References

External links
Technology Centre Teknia Ltd.
Microteknia sightseeing (YouTube amateur video)
Facts about Kuopio Science Park (yearly review 2005)
KUH "Promoting health" -brochure (2005)

Kuopio
Science parks in Finland
Buildings and structures in North Savo